Golden Pillz: The Luna Remixes is a 2002 remix album by industrial music group My Life with the Thrill Kill Kult featuring remixes from the 2001 album The Reincarnation of Luna.

Track listing

Release
The CD was released in 2002 by Sleazebox Records.

References

External links

2002 remix albums
My Life with the Thrill Kill Kult albums
Industrial remix albums